Thomas Poulsen (born 16 February 1970) is a Danish competition rower, Olympic champion and world record holder.

Poulsen won a gold medal in lightweight coxless four at the 1996 Summer Olympics as part of the Gold Four. He was member of the team that set a world record in 1999, with the time 5:45.60 (for 2000 metres).

References

1970 births
Living people
Danish male rowers
Olympic rowers of Denmark
Rowers at the 1996 Summer Olympics
Olympic gold medalists for Denmark
Olympic medalists in rowing
Medalists at the 1996 Summer Olympics
World Rowing Championships medalists for Denmark